John Russell Foster (born November 3, 1966) is an American paleontologist. Foster has worked with dinosaur remains from the Late Jurassic of the Colorado Plateau and Rocky Mountains, as well as working on Cambrian age trilobite faunas in the southwest region of the American west. He named the crocodiliform trace fossil Hatcherichnus sanjuanensis in 1997 and identified the first known occurrence of the theropod trace fossil Hispanosauropus in North America in 2015.

Career 

 Born November 3, 1966, San Diego, California.
 High School, Los Gatos High School, Los Gatos, California. 1985 
 A.B. Geology, Occidental College, Los Angeles, California. 1989
 M.S. Paleontology, South Dakota School of Mines and Technology, Rapid City, South Dakota. 1993
 Ph. D. University of Colorado, Boulder, Colorado. 1998

He is adjunct faculty of geology at Colorado Mesa University, Grand Junction, Colorado. 
From 2014-2018 he was the Director of the Museum of Moab. He served for thirteen years as Curator of Paleontology at the Museums of Western Colorado from 2001 to 2014. He is currently a curator at the Utah Field House of Natural History State Park Museum in Vernal, Utah.

Professional Work 
An expert on the Late Jurassic, he has spent more than twenty-five years excavating fossils across the western United States, authoring and coauthoring more than 55 professional papers, ranging from Triassic to Cretaceous, with a few Cambrian and Cenozoic studies appearing as well. In addition to dinosaurs, he has spent over a decade working in the Cambrian shales of the western United States.

Triassic 
In December 2017, he and coauthors Xavier A. Jenkins of Arizona State University and Robert J. Gay of Colorado Canyons Association formally published their study on the oldest known dinosaur from Utah, a neotheropod that is likely an animal similar to Coelophysis.

Jurassic 
His researches in the Late Jurassic of the Colorado Plateau and Rocky Mountains includes the geographic and environmental distributions of microvertebrates and dinosaurs. He served as the lead researcher at the Mygatt-Moore Quarry in western Colorado for 14 years, and continues to work in the Late Jurassic of eastern Utah and western Colorado. His current work includes the excavation of the first known dinosaur from the western United States, "Dystrophaeus," on Bureau of Land Management lands in San Juan County, Utah. Foster had a ceratosaurid ceratosaur theropod dinosaur, Fosterovenator, named after him in 2014

Cambrian 
His researches in the Cambrian of the Great Basin and Colorado Plateau, includes the study of taphonomy and biostratinomy of trilobites, and what this information indicates about the paleoenvironmental conditions on the shallow shelf of western North American during the early Paleozoic.

Popular books 
Foster is the author of Jurassic West: The Dinosaurs of the Morrison Formation and Their World, followed by his second book Cambrian Ocean World.

References

Bibliography

Foster, J. R., and McMullen, S. K. 2017. Paleobiogeographic distribution of Testudinata and neosuchian Crocodyliformes in the Morrison Formation (Upper Jurassic) of North America: Evidence of habitat zonation? Palaeogeography, Palaeoclimatology, Palaeoecology 468:208–215.
Lockley, M. G., Gierlinski, G., Matthews, N. A., Xing, L., Foster, J. R., and Cart, K. 2017. New dinosaur track occurrences from the Upper Jurassic Salt Wash Member (Morrison Formation) of southeastern Utah: Implications for thyreophoran trackmaker distribution and diversity. Palaeogeography, Palaeoclimatology, Palaeoecology 470:116–121.
 Foster, J. R., and Peterson, J. E. 2016. First report of Apatosaurus (Diplodocidae: Apatosaurinae) from the Cleveland-Lloyd Quarry in the Upper Jurassic Morrison Formation of Utah: Abundance, distribution, paleoecology, and taphonomy of an endemic North American sauropod clade. Palaeoworld 25:431–443.
 Foster, J. R., and Gaines, R. R. 2016. Taphonomy and paleoecology of the “Middle” Cambrian (Series 3) formations in Utah’s West Desert: Recent finds and new data. Utah Geological Association Publication 45:291–336.
 Foster, J. R., McHugh, J. B., Peterson, J. E., and Leschin, M. F. 2016. Major bonebeds in mudrocks of the Morrison Formation (Upper Jurassic), northern Colorado Plateau of Utah and Colorado. Geology of the Intermountain West 3:33–66.
 D’Emic, M. D., and Foster, J. R. 2016. The oldest Cretaceous North American sauropod dinosaur. Historical Biology 28:470–478.
 Hunt-Foster, R. K., Lockley, M. G., Milner, A. R. C., Foster, J. R., Matthews, N. A., Breithaupt, B. H., and Smith, J. A. 2016. Tracking dinosaurs in BLM Canyon Country, Utah. Geology of the Intermountain West 3:67– 100. 
 Foster, J. R. 2015. Theropod dinosaur ichnogenus Hispanosauropus identified from the Morrison Formation (Upper Jurassic), western North America. Ichnos 22:183–191.
 Foster, J. R., and Hunt-Foster, R. K. 2015. First report of a giant neosuchian (Crocodyliformes) in the Williams Fork Formation (Upper Cretaceous: Campanian) of Colorado. Cretaceous Research 55:66–73.
 Foster, J. R., Trujillo, K. C., Frost, F., and Mims, A. L. 2015. Summary of vertebrate fossils from the Morrison Formation (Upper Jurassic) at Curecanti National Recreation Area, central Colorado. New Mexico Museum of Natural History and Science Bulletin 67:77–84.
 Foster, J. R. 2014. Cambrian Ocean World: Ancient Sea Life of North America. Indiana University Press, Bloomington, 416 p.
 Foster, J. R., and Wedel, M. J. 2014. Haplocanthosaurus (Saurischia: Sauropoda) from the lower Morrison Formation (Upper Jurassic) near Snowmass, Colorado. Volumina Jurassica 12(2):197–210.
 Woodruff, D. C., and Foster, J. R. 2014. The fragile legacy of Amphicoelias fragillimus (Dinosauria: Sauropoda; Morrison Formation – latest Jurassic). Volumina Jurassica 12(2):211–220.
 Trujillo, K. C., Foster, J. R., Hunt-Foster, R. K., and Chamberlain, K. R. 2014. A U/Pb age for the Mygatt-Moore Quarry, Upper Jurassic Morrison Formation, Mesa County, Colorado. Volumina Jurassica 12(2):107–114.
 Lockley, M. G., Buckley, L. G., Foster, J. R., Kirkland, J. I., and Deblieux, D. D. 2014. First report of bird tracks (Aquatilavipes) from the Cedar Mountain Formation (Lower Cretaceous), eastern Utah. Palaeogeography, Palaeoclimatology, Palaeoecology 420:150–162.
 Lockley, M. G., Hunt-Foster, R. K., Foster, J. R., Cart, K., and Gerwe, D. S. 2014. Early Jurassic track assemblages from the Granite Creek area of eastern Utah. New Mexico Museum of Natural History and Science Bulletin 62:205–210.
 Foster, J. R. 2013. Ecological segregation of the Late Jurassic stegosaurian and iguanodontian dinosaurs of the Morrison Formation in North America: pronounced or subtle? PalArch’s Journal of Vertebrate Palaeontology 10(3):1–11.
 Foster, J. R. 2011. Trilobite taphonomy of the Latham Shale (Lower Cambrian; Dyeran), Mojave Desert, California: an inner detrital belt Burgess Shale-type deposit of western Laurentia. In Johnston, P. A., and Johnston, K. J., eds., International Conference on the Cambrian Explosion, Proceedings, Palaeontographica Canadiana 31:119–140.
 Foster, J. R. 2011. Bonnima sp. (Trilobita; Corynexochida) from the Chambless Limestone (Lower Cambrian) of the Marble Mountains, California: first Dorypygidae in a cratonic region of the southern Cordillera. PaleoBios 30:45–49.
 Foster, J. R. 2011. Trilobites and other fauna from two quarries in the Bright Angel Shale (Middle Cambrian, Series 3; Delamaran), Grand Canyon National Park, Arizona. In Hollingsworth, J. S., Sundberg, F. A., and Foster, J. R., eds., Cambrian Stratigraphy and Paleontology of Northern Arizona and Southern Nevada: The 16th Field Conference of the Cambrian Stage Subdivision Working Group, International Subcommission on Cambrian Stratigraphy, Museum of Northern Arizona Bulletin 67:99–120.
 Foster, J. R. 2011. A short review of the geology and paleontology of the Cambrian sedimentary rocks of the southern Marble Mountains, Mojave Desert, California. New Mexico Museum of Natural History and Science Bulletin 53:38–51.
 Foster, J. R. 2011. Trilobite taphonomy in the lower Pioche Formation (Dyeran; Global Stage 4) at Frenchman Mountain, Nevada. In Hollingsworth, J. S., Sundberg, F. A., and Foster, J. R., eds., Cambrian Stratigraphy and Paleontology of Northern Arizona and Southern Nevada: The 16th Field Conference of the Cambrian Stage Subdivision Working Group, International Subcommission on Cambrian Stratigraphy, Museum of Northern Arizona Bulletin 67:282–283.
 Foster, J. R., and Heckert, A. B. 2011. Ichthyoliths and other microvertebrate remains from the Morrison Formation (Upper Jurassic) of northeastern Wyoming: a screen-washed sample indicates a significant aquatic component to the fauna. Palaeogeography, Palaeoclimatology, Palaeoecology 305:264–279.
 Foster, J. R., and Hunt-Foster, R. K. 2011. New occurrences of dinosaur skin of two types (Sauropoda? and Dinosauria indet.) from the Late Jurassic of North America (Mygatt-Moore Quarry, Morrison Formation). Journal of Vertebrate Paleontology 31:717–721.
 Lockley, M. G., and Foster, J. R. 2010. An assemblage of probable crocodylian traces and associated dinosaur tracks from the lower Morrison Formation (Upper Jurassic) of eastern Utah. New Mexico Museum of Natural History and Science Bulletin 51:93–97.
 Farlow, J. O., Coroian, I. D., and Foster, J. R. 2010. Giants on the landscape: modeling the abundance of megaherbivorous dinosaurs of the Morrison Formation (Late Jurassic, western USA). Historical Biology 22:403–429.
 Foster, J. R. 2009. Preliminary body mass estimates for mammalian genera of the Morrison Formation (Upper Jurassic, North America). PaleoBios 28:114–122.
 Foster, J. R. 2009. Taphonomic characteristics of a quarry in the Bright Angel Shale (Middle Cambrian), Grand Canyon National Park, Arizona: a preliminary look. In Baltzer, E., ed., American Institute of Professional Geologists, Conference Proceedings, Rocky Mountains and the Colorado Plateau: Canyons, Resources, and Hazards, p. 77–80.
 Foster, J.R. 2007. "Jurassic West: The Dinosaurs of the Morrison Formation and Their World. Indiana University". Indiana University Press, Bloomington, 387 p.'.
 Foster, J. R. 2006. The mandible of a juvenile goniopholidid (Crocodyliformes) from the Morrison Formation (Upper Jurassic) of Wyoming. New Mexico Museum of Natural History and Science Bulletin 36:101–105.
 Foster, J. R., and Chure, D. J. 2006. Hindlimb allometry in the Late Jurassic theropod dinosaur Allosaurus, with comments on its abundance and distribution. New Mexico Museum of Natural History and Science Bulletin 36:119–122.

External links 
 John Foster.

Living people
1966 births
American paleontologists